Brandon Alexander Taylor (born August 1, 1994) is an American professional basketball player for the Ningbo Rockets of the Chinese Basketball Association (CBA). He is a 5'10" (1.78 m) tall point guard.

High school
Taylor grew up in Tabernacle Township, New Jersey and played high school basketball at Trenton Catholic Academy, where The Times of Trenton, New Jersey selected him as its 2011-12 boys basketball player of the year.

College career
Taylor played 4 years of NCAA Division I college basketball at Penn State, where he played with the Penn State Lions. In his 4-year college career, he averaged 10.0 points, 5.0 rebounds, 0.8 assists, 0.4 steals, and 0.7 blocks per game, in 26.1 minutes per game, over 129 games played. In his senior season, 2015–16, he averaged 16.3 points, 6.5 rebounds, 1.6 assists, 0.6 steals, and 0.5 blocks per game, in 32.3 minutes per game.

College statistics

|-
| style="text-align:left;"| 2012–13
| style="text-align:left;"| Penn State
| 31 || 18  || 20.2 || .349 || .286 || .688 || 3.3 || 0.3 || 0.3 || 0.4 || 5.3
|-
| style="text-align:left;"| 2013–14
| style="text-align:left;"| Penn State
| 34 || 30  || 24.9 || .395 || .322 || .877 || 4.9 || 0.6 || 0.1 || 1.1 || 9.2
|-
| style="text-align:left;"| 2014–15
| style="text-align:left;"| Penn State
| 32 || 25  || 26.9 || .371 || .335 || .633 || 5.3 || 0.9 || 0.5 || 0.8 || 9.1
|-
| style="text-align:left;"| 2015–16
| style="text-align:left;"| Penn State
| 32 || 32  || 32.3 || .433 || .359 || .727 || 6.5 || 1.6 || 0.6 || 0.5 || 16.3
|- class="sortbottom"
| style="text-align:center;" colspan=2| Career
| 129 || 105 || 26.1 || .396 || .328 || .753 || 5.0 || 0.8 || 0.4 || 0.7 || 10.0

Professional career
Taylor began his pro career in Greece in 2016, with the Greek Basket League club PAOK. On January 13, 2017, he parted ways with PAOK, after averaging 2.9 points per game in Greek League, and 4.2 points per contest in Champions League. On February 18, 2017, Taylor signed with the Swiss team 5 Stelle Massagno, of the Swiss League.

On August 7, 2017, Taylor signed with Jämtland Basket of the Basketligan.

On July 2, 2019, Taylor returned to Greece and joined the Rethymno Cretan Kings. He was unexpectedly released on July 7 of the same year, due to a shoulder injury.

Personal
Taylor's cousin, Tiffany Stansbury, was also a professional basketball player, and she played in the WNBA. Taylor's uncle, Terence Stansbury, was also a professional basketball player, and he played in the NBA.

References

External links
Champions League Profile
Eurobasket.com profile
Greek Basket League profile 
Greek Basket League profile 
Draftexpress.com profile
Penn State Nittany Lions bio
ESPN.com college stats

1994 births
Living people
American expatriate basketball people in Finland
American expatriate basketball people in Greece
American expatriate basketball people in Sweden
American expatriate basketball people in Switzerland
American men's basketball players
Basketball players from New Jersey
Jämtland Basket players
P.A.O.K. BC players
Penn State Nittany Lions basketball players
People from Tabernacle Township, New Jersey
People from Willingboro Township, New Jersey
Power forwards (basketball)
SAM Basket players
Small forwards
Sportspeople from Burlington County, New Jersey
Trenton Catholic Academy alumni